Sanjiang University (Chinese: 三江学院) is a university in the countryside of Nanjing city, which is the capital of China's Jiangsu Province.

Sanjiang University is the first private institution of higher learning in the Jiangsu Province. The current president is Professor Chen Wannian, who is a member of the ninth National People's Congress of China.

The campus occupies an area of more than 300,000 square metres, and its buildings have 200,000 square metres of floor space.

The student body of this institution consists of around 18,000 students, including 1300 students in Continued Education School. Sanjiang University also recruits foreign students. Sanjiang University employs around 550 faculty members, of which, more than 380 are professors and associate professors.

External links
Official site (in Chinese)
Description in English
三江学院位置

References

Universities and colleges in Nanjing